Landfall is the time at which a storm (usually a tropical cyclone or waterspout) passes over shore.

Landfall may also refer to:

Places 
 Landfall, Minnesota, United States
 Landfall, also known as Kent Cottage, Brigus, Newfoundland
 Landfall Island, Andaman and Nicobar Islands, India
 Landfall Peak, Thurston Island, Antarctica

Popular culture 
 Landfall (journal), a New Zealand literary journal
 Landfall (1949 film), a British film
 Landfall (1975 film), a New Zealand film
 Landfall (2017 film), an Australian thriller film
 Landfall (album), an album by Martin Carthy
 Landfall: A Channel Story, a novel by Nevil Shute
 Landfall, a 2018 album by Laurie Anderson with Kronos Quartet

Other uses 
 Landfall, the name given to the vessel LCT 7074 by the Master Mariners' Club of Liverpool
 Landfall Games, developer of video games Clustertruck, Totally Accurate Battle Simulator, and Totally Accurate Battlegrounds

See also

 Landing (disambiguation)
 Mooring (disambiguation)
 Docking (disambiguation)
 
 
 Land (disambiguation)
 Fall (disambiguation)